The Birmingham bid for the 2022 Commonwealth Games was a bid by Birmingham, England and Commonwealth Games England to host the 2022 Commonwealth Games. On 21 December 2017 it was announced that the bid has been successful.

Background 
Birmingham was actually planning to bid for the 2026 Commonwealth Games. On 13 March 2017, Commonwealth Games Federation stripped Durban, South Africa of their rights to host the 2022 Commonwealth Games and reopened the bid process for the 2022 games. On 19 June 2017 Birmingham announced its bid to host the 2022 Commonwealth Games along with unveiling of its bid logo.

The bid had the full support of: Birmingham City Council; three regional local enterprise partnerships (Greater Birmingham and Solihull Local Enterprise Partnership; Black Country Local Enterprise Partnership; Coventry and Warwickshire Local Enterprise Partnership); the West Midlands Combined Authority, the West Midlands Growth Company and the newly elected Mayor of West Midlands, Andy Street. Four-time Olympic gold medallist and multiple world champion Sir Mo Farah and CEO of Aston Villa F.C. Keith Wyness also supported the bid.

Birmingham had also bid to host the 1992 Summer Olympics, but Barcelona was selected.

Previous events hosted 
Birmingham has a track record of delivering large international sporting and cultural events, such as: 
 The Ashes test matches
 1993 World Artistic Gymnastics Championships
 Yonex All England Open Badminton Championships since 1994
 1995 World Netball Championships
 Eurovision Song Contest 1998
 2007 European Athletics Indoor Championships 
 2010 European Men's Artistic Gymnastics Championships
 2011 Trampoline World Championships
 2012 UCI BMX World Championships
 2015 Rugby World Cup fixtures
 2017 ICC Champions Trophy
 2018 World Indoor Athletics Championships 
 IAAF Diamond League 
 Davis Cup tennis
 Aegon Classic tennis championships

Venues 

Birmingham has a number of existing sports venues, arenas and conference halls that are suited for hosting sport during the Games. 95% of the competition venues were already in place for the 2022 games. Alexander Stadium which will host the ceremonies and athletics will be renovated and the capacity will be increased from 12,000 to 50,000 seats. A 400-metre warm up track will also be developed. This would leave the stadium well placed to become the home of UK Athletics, hosting all the major national and international competitions after the Games.

Venues in Birmingham

Venues outside Birmingham

See also 
 Birmingham bid for the 1992 Summer Olympics
 2002 Commonwealth Games at Manchester, England
 1934 Commonwealth Games at London, England

References

External links 
 Bid Website

2022 Commonwealth Games bids
Birmingham, West Midlands-related lists
Sport in Birmingham, West Midlands
2022 in English sport
International sports competitions in Birmingham, West Midlands